Cass Fjord is a fjord in northern Greenland. To the southwest, the fjord opens into the Kane Basin of the Nares Strait.

Geography
The Cass Fjord opens to the SW at the northern end of Peabody Bay, north of Cape Clay. Cass Fjord forms Washington Land's southeastern coastline and the facing shore is part of Daugaard-Jensen Land.

See also
List of fjords of Greenland
Cass Fjord Formation

References

External links
Stratigraphy of the Cass Fjord Formation (Middle and Upper Cambrian), North Greenland

Fjords of Greenland